Roxburgh and Selkirk was a county constituency of the House of Commons of the Parliament of the United Kingdom (Westminster) from 1918 to 1955. It elected one Member of Parliament (MP) by the first past the post voting system.

Boundaries 

The constituency was created by the Representation of the People Act 1918, and first used in the 1918 general election, to cover the counties of Roxburgh and Selkirk.

At least nominally, the counties had been covered previously by the Roxburghshire and Peebles and Selkirk constituencies.

For the 1955 general election, as a result of the First Periodical Review of the Boundary Commission, the Roxburgh and Selkirk constituency was abolished and the Roxburgh, Selkirk and Peebles constituency was created, covering the counties of Roxburgh, Selkirk, and Peebles.

Members of Parliament

Election results

Election in the 1910s

Elections in the 1920s

Elections in the 1930s

Elections in the 1940s 
A General election was due to take place before the end of 1940, but was postponed due to the Second World War. By 1939, the following candidates had been selected to contest this constituency;
Unionist Party: William Scott
Liberal Party: James Scott

Elections in the 1950s

References

Sources

Historic parliamentary constituencies in Scotland (Westminster)
Selkirkshire
Constituencies of the Parliament of the United Kingdom established in 1918
Constituencies of the Parliament of the United Kingdom disestablished in 1955